Sucking in the Seventies is the sixth official compilation album by The Rolling Stones, released in 1981.  As the successor to 1975's Made in the Shade, it covers material from It's Only Rock 'n Roll (1974), Black and Blue (1976), Some Girls (1978) and Emotional Rescue (1980) recording sessions.  Deviating from the standard practice of "greatest hits" albums, it contains a mix of hit songs, remixes and alternate takes of album tracks, B-sides, and live recordings.

Contents

All tracks on Sucking in the Seventies except "Shattered" and "Everything Is Turning to Gold" were mixed or edited for this release. "When the Whip Comes Down" is presented in an otherwise unreleased live version, recorded in Detroit on the band's 1978 tour.

"If I Was a Dancer (Dance Pt. 2)" is a longer and different mix and containing different lyrics from "Dance (Pt. 1)", the opening track on Emotional Rescue (1980).  The Rolling Stones' only #1 hit of this period, "Miss You", is not included on this compilation.

Release and reception

Released in the spring of 1981, as Tattoo You was nearing its completion, Sucking in the Seventies reached #15 in the U.S., going gold, but failed to chart in the UK.

Stephen Thomas Erlewine of AllMusic writes: 

In 2005, the album was remastered and reissued by Virgin Records.

Track listing
All songs by Mick Jagger and Keith Richards, except where noted.

Side one
"Shattered" – 3:46
From Some Girls (1978)
"Everything Is Turning to Gold" (Jagger, Richards, Ronnie Wood) – 4:06
B-side to "Shattered"
"Hot Stuff" – 3:30
Edited version from Black and Blue (1976)
"Time Waits for No One" – 4:25
Edited version from It's Only Rock 'n' Roll (1974)
"Fool to Cry" – 4:07
Edited version from Black and Blue (1976)

Side two
"Mannish Boy" (Ellas McDaniel, Mel London, McKinley Morganfield) – 4:38
Edited version from Love You Live (1977)
"When the Whip Comes Down" (Live version) – 4:35
Recorded live in Detroit on 6 July 1978
"If I Was a Dancer (Dance Pt. 2)" (Jagger, Richards, Wood) – 5:50
Previously unreleased, from the Emotional Rescue sessions (1980)
"Crazy Mama" – 4:06
Edited version from Black and Blue (1976)
"Beast of Burden" – 3:27
Edited version from Some Girls (1978)

Charts
Album

Singles

Certifications

References

1981 greatest hits albums
Albums produced by the Glimmer Twins
The Rolling Stones compilation albums
Virgin Records compilation albums
Rolling Stones Records compilation albums